The following is a list of Registered Historic Places in Iron County, Michigan. The list includes 79 structures and historic districts that are significant for their architectural, historical, or industrial/economic importance.



History
Iron County, originally part of Marquette County, was first surveyed in 1851.  At that time, the area was populated almost exclusively by Native Americans from the Menominee and Ojibwe tribes. Although the original 1851 survey of the county noted the presence of iron ore, European settlers began arriving in numbers in 1875, prospecting for iron ore. In 1880, two important ore strikes were made: the first was by John Armstrong, who opened the Crystal Falls Mine along the Paint River, and the second was by Donald C. MacKinnon, who opened the Iron River (or Riverton) Mine along the Iron River. These two mines were the foundation of the two main population centers of the county, and the success of the mines brought more prospectors to the area, with 70 mines eventually producing ore in the county.

Logging also began in the county in 1875, and lumber mills were soon another important contributor the area's economy. Railroads, particularly the Chicago and Northwestern Railroad, extended lines into the county to service the expanding mines. Lines to both Iron River and Crystal Falls were completed in 1882, and both settlements expanded rapidly.

Separate townships for Iron River and Crystal Falls, still under the auspices of Marquette County, were created in 1882.  However, there was much local sentiment for establishing a new county for the area, and in 1885 Iron County was split from Marquette County.

At the time of Iron County's creation, Iron River, then the only incorporated village in the county, was designated the county seat.  However, a bitter dispute over the location of county buildings immediately erupted between the geographically disparate east side, centered on Crystal Falls, and the west side, centered on Iron River. The dispute lasted until 1889, when a county-wide general election designated Crystal Falls as the county seat.

By 1890, there were nearly 4500 people living in Iron County, supported primarily by the mining and timber industries.  However, the Panic of 1893 caused a depression in iron prices that lead to the closing of nearly all iron mines in the county and a severe curtailing of lumbering activities. County residents turned to agriculture to support themselves. The economy of the area rebounded around the turn of the century as major mining companies, such as the M. A. Hanna Company and Pickands, Mather and Company bought up smaller mines in the area. Logging of hardwoods began in the county around the same time, and a long period of sustained growth stretched until the Great Depression.

The population of the county crew substantially during this time, reaching 20,805 in 1930.  A great many of the newcomers were immigrants from Ireland, Italy, Poland, Scandinavia, Scotland, and Wales. New villages were platted, primarily to house mine workers, including Alpha, Mineral Hills, Caspian, and Gaastra. Iron River, Crystal Falls, and Stambaugh were all expanded.  To serve the new residents, an electric street car line was installed in 1906, and a number of public schools were built.

The Great Depression ended Iron County's economic boom. Iron mining in the county was completely halted, and lumbering was substantially reduced, leaving thousands of workers unemployed.  Several federal government projects were funded in the county, including the Cooks Run Trout Feeding Station (built in 1933-34), the Pentoga Park Office and Bathhouse (built in 1936), and various Civilian Conservation Corps projects crafted by workers at Camp Gibbs (built in 1934).

The mining industry was temporarily revived by World War II, but mining declined steadily in the postwar years, with few mines lasting into the 1960s and the last iron mine in the county closing in 1979.  Lumber, however, has remained a substantial economic enterprise in the area, employing thousands of people until the present day.

Historic places
There are 80 listings on the National Register of Historic Places in Iron County, Michigan.  These structures date primarily from Iron County's economic boom during the first two decades of the 20th century, although some structures date from the initial influx of residents soon after the 1880 start of intensive iron mining.

The first structure listed, in 1975, was the Iron County Courthouse, which is probably the most architecturally significant structure in the county.  Nearly all the subsequent listings were submitted as part of the Iron County MRA, a 1983 Multiple Property Submission that attempted to collect the most historically and architecturally significant structures in the county. Seventy-two of the Iron County listings are part of this MRA, and one more property, Central School, was initially nominated as part of the MRA but actually listed separately, in 2008.  Four more structures, all highway bridges, were listed as part of the Highway Bridges of Michigan Multiple Property Submission.  Other than the Courthouse, only one structure on this list, the Chicago, Milwaukee and Saint Paul Railway Iron River Depot, was not associated with either of the Multiple Property Submissions.

 

|}

Former listings

|}

See also

 List of Michigan State Historic Sites in Iron County, Michigan
 List of National Historic Landmarks in Michigan
 National Register of Historic Places listings in Michigan
 Listings in neighboring counties: Baraga, Dickinson, Florence (WI), Forest (WI), Gogebic, Houghton, Marquette, Ontonagon, Vilas

References

Iron County
Iron County, Michigan
Buildings and structures in Iron County, Michigan